Danny Vaughn, born Daniel Himler on July 18th, 1961, is an American singer. Vaughn has performed with Waysted, Tyketto and Vaughn and now performs and releases under his own name. He was also a lead singer in the Ultimate Eagles.

Danny Vaughn is a product of Steiner education. At lower school, he was placed into a choir. “My first public performance was singing Pie Jesu in soprano. I remember the audience craning their necks to see who the little kid who sang the solo was. My best-loved experience, during those days, was singing in harmony. It stayed with me ever since.”
His schooling taught Vaughn to read and enjoy classical music, though his teenage years were filled with a love for the pop classics, especially Beatles, Simon & Garfunkel: anything that provided harmonizing, folk-rock, edged with the baroque.

After leaving school, Danny played in several local cover bands, many of them playing classic covers in rock-joints around Rockland County.
“One day I got a message that the Welsh rock guitarist Paul Chapman (Skid Row, UFO) was looking for me. I brushed it aside, but my curiosity got the better of me and I called the number. I was invited to do an audition down in Florida, for Paul's new project: DOA, and recorded a demo with him that he took to the UK to shop with the record companies there. But that went by the wayside when Pete Way invited Paul to join Waysted instead. Of course they'd already found themselves a talented vocalist in Fin Muir. So that was that!” 
“But in 1985, they had a falling out with Fin and I was invited to learn a bunch of Waysted and UFO songs just days before a huge show at Ramat Gan football stadium, in Tel Aviv. I endured. It was my trial-by fire-audition for a band I continued to play with till 1987.” 

1987 Vaughn formed Tyketto, a band he was in until 1994 when he was replaced by future Journey singer Steve Augeri. Tyketto split up in 1996, but have played mini-tours with Vaughn and other original members at various times since 2004. In April, 2008 the band played in Brazil with a further performance planned for Firefest V in Nottingham in October, 2008. The reunited Tyketto also released two albums Dig In Deep (2012) and Reach (2016)

Vaughn has also released albums with Flesh & Blood (Blues for Daze) and From the Inside (From the Inside and 2008's Visions) and appeared on the 1991 album Union by progressive rockers Yes. 

In 2003 Vaughn played the part of Lancelot on Gary Hughes's rock opera Once and Future King Part I.

July 2009 saw Vaughn release a new live album entitled The Road Les Travelled. Recorded in Newcastle, England in December 2008 the album features Vaughn & band run through an unplugged set of songs from throughout the singer's career. The album was released via UK rock website HardRockHouse.com and is available exclusively through the site.

Danny Vaughn has brought out a compilation album on June 14, 2010 called Reprise. It is a collection of both of his group, Vaughn's albums including the songs: "Soldiers and Sailors on Riverside", (live) and a few surprises like "House of Cards", which was only released on a single before. Besides this, there are old and new photographs and a new interview of Vaughn. 

2019 saw  Vaughn launch his solo album, entitled Myths, Legends & Lies: a project that he worked towards for many years. “It's an album I've been talking about making for over fourteen years,” Danny explains, “A bunch of songs I call my orphans: they're a group of numbers, collected over decades, that I never found a proper home for.” 
“This is not what you'd expect from me,” he goes on. “I'm a rock guy. Everyone knows that! But sometimes I felt trapped by the designation. That's why it's been hard to find a place for these personal songs.” 
The album was met with rave reviews: “This Mr Vaughn, is your masterpiece,” said The Rockpit. “These 14 songs.... don't follow a formula, they don't need to. They just sound utterly magnificent. 10 out of 10," said Andy Thorley of Maximum Volume Music, whilst Rushonrock proclaimed, “ 'Myths, Legends & Lies; the latest example of Vaughn’s criminally underrated talent laid bare.” 

Some of the material on Myths, Legends & Lies album goes way back into his early musical life. “The first song that I ever wrote for myself — it's on Myths, Legends & Lies,” he explains, “is the Missouri Kid. I wrote the song as an eighteen-year-old kid, so it's fair to say it's gone through a lot of changes. I've always been attracted to the Southern rock style (especially Blackfoot), so that sort of sound influences some of my writing, although it does not dominate.” 
The road that’s led to Danny’s project becoming a reality hasn’t been straightforward. Events have often altered the route, as Danny explains: “I was going to do Myths, Legends & Lies at Rockfield Studios, but serendipity ended up leading me elsewhere - to Tim Hamill, whom I'd met while working on an Ultimate Eagles recording. I always kinda gravitate back to Wales. I don't know why. It's uncanny.” 
So, building on the undoubted achievement of Tyketto’s We've Got Tomorrow We've Got Tonight — the 14-piece band extravaganza that was made in Pontypridd, Wales, which consisted of re-booted and re-structured Tyketto classics, turned into miniature rock concertos — with Danny fronting — Vaughn entered Sonic One in Llangennech, Carmarthenshire, with Chris Childs (bass), Rhys Morgan (drums), Nigel Hopkins (piano) and a host of other distinguished guest musicians, to record his “orphan songs.” 

“Like many things in my life, finding my way to Sonic One was such a happy accident that it seems like fate. For example, we were able to get hold of Andrew Griffiths. He plays the kind of hot horn you didn't think could be found outside New Orleans. Bringing the sounds together was really easy too. At Sonic One, I worked with very accomplished musicians. And, although I'm the song originator, I prefer collaboration over inflexibility. I didn't need to yank the reins on those guys: the songs were the primary centre of their attention, and they knew it.” 
“Lyrically, my songs have been shaped and re-shaped over time. My influences have included John Hiatt, Don Henley, Bruce Hornsby, Tom Waits and Bernie Taupin, among others. 
“Storytelling has also been a strong influence on me,” Danny adds, “especially the oral tradition. I was lucky enough to have been brought up amongst a strong culture of that: both my parents read to me as a child and that included the entire Lord of the Rings books, as well as the Zen myth Monkey and Conan Doyle’s Sherlock Holmes stories." Not all stories run smoothly or have happy endings.

"I became a victim of the PledgeMusic difficulties," admits Danny. "Thankfully, just before it was too late — another timely piece of good luck! — I managed to pull the project from the platform and collect-up all my fans: all those who'd already been drawn to the project. This meant I had to do things for myself, of course. It was a stressful time, but, by acting at exactly the right moment, I managed to retain most of my pledgers. I'm pleased to say that all of them received their promised albums, on time and at the agreed-upon date.” 
“Looking back,” he reflects, “perhaps the headache caused by PledgeMusic was actually a blessing. It gave me the push & impulse I probably needed to get the job done and it also made me realize, more than anything, that the fans are on my side and they are indispensable and significant. And if you have fans on your side, nothing is impossible."

Danny and Dan Reed (frontman of funk rockers Dan Reed Network) decided to combine their talents in a joint project: a live acoustic touring act called Snake Oil & Harmony. 
The project led to two acclaimed tours, where they shared their songs and the stories behind them with audiences throughout Europe. Snake Oil & Harmony released their debut album, Hurricane Riders, in March 2020. 

Meanwhile, Vaughn will be continuing with his solo and band work and Tyketto. On June 18th 2022, Danny Vaughn announced on Youtube, that co-founder Michael Clayton and guitarist Chris Green will leave Tyketto for family reasons in 2023. Their last concert will be at the Melodic Rock Cruise in 2023.

Discography

Solo albums
Traveller (2007)
Myths, Legends and Lies (2019)

Live albums
The Road Less Travelled (2009)

Extended plays
Standing Alone (2002)

with Waysted
Save Your Prayers (1986)

with Tyketto
Don't Come Easy (1991)
Strength in Numbers (1994)
Dig in Deep (2012)
Reach (2016)
Live In Milan (2017)
We've Got Tomorrow, We've Got Tonight (2019)
Strength In Numbers Live (2019)

with Flesh & Blood
Blues for Daze (1997)

with Vaughn
 Soldiers and Sailors on Riverside (2000)
 Fearless (2001)

with From the Inside
From the Inside (2004)
Visions (2008)

with The Illegal Eagles
Back in the Fast Lane (2008)

with Burning Kingdom
Simplified (2013)

with Snake Oil & Harmony (Dan Reed)
Hurricane Riders (2020)

References

External links
 Official Site
 HardRockHouse

Year of birth missing (living people)
Living people
Place of birth missing (living people)
American rock singers
Waysted members
Geffen Records artists
Music for Nations artists
Frontiers Records artists